

Plants

Angiosperms

Molluscs

Newly named bivalves

Arthropods

Fishes

Amphibians

Newly named amphibians

Basal reptiles

Newly named basal reptiles

Ichthyopterygians

Newly named ichthyopterygians

Lepidosauromorphs

Newly named plesiosaurs

Newly named basal lepidosaurs

Newly named lizards

Newly named snakes

Turtles

Newly named turtles

Archosauromorphs

Newly named basal archosauromorphs

Archosaurs

Synapsids

Newly named non-mammalian synapsids

Mammals

Other animals

Footnotes

Complete author list
As science becomes more collaborative, papers with large numbers of authors are becoming more common. To prevent the deformation of the tables, these footnotes list the contributors to papers that erect new genera and have many authors.

References